PetSmart Charities and PetSmart Charities of Canada are non-profit organizations dedicated to saving the lives of homeless pets.  In the United States, PetSmart Charities is the largest financial supporter of animal welfare and among the 400 largest philanthropic organizations working on any issue. PetSmart Charities was formed in 1994 by PetSmart founders Jim and Janice Dougherty, who chose never to sell dogs and cats within their stores.  Their primary goal is to save the lives of homeless pets through programs such as their In-Store Adoption Centers in many PetSmart locations, Rescue Waggin' disaster relief program, grant program for animal welfare agencies across North America, and community adoption events.  Another focus of the organization is increasing spay/neuter services to help communities solve the problem of pet overpopulation.

Funding 

The primary source of funding is from in-store PIN pad donations when customers check out, as well as PetSmart employee contributions through the PetSmart Associates United to Stop Euthanasia (P.A.U.S.E.) fundraising program.

Major donations
The charity has made major donations to further animal welfare. In 2007, it gave a $420,750 to the University of California-Davis. According to the organization, the fund will be used to finance an urgent need for an academic position dedicated to extending medical knowledge to shelter professionals. In 2006, PetSmart Charities awarded $2.3 million in grants to help disaster relief agencies and animal welfare organizations address the needs of pets abandoned, hurt or lost during hurricanes and other natural disasters. In 2006, it offered a request for proposals for $20,000 matching grants toward the establishment of state animal response teams in the U.S. The SART model is a public-private partnership for preparation and response to animal emergencies.

Animal welfare and adoption support 

PetSmart Charities fund spay and neuter programs to reduce the number of feral or unwanted animals. It also funds animal rescue operations that transfer animals to adoption shelters.

Most PetSmart locations have an adoption center to house animals from local animal welfare organizations. PetSmart donates space for each center in their stores, PetSmart Charities funds the cost to build the center, and local animal welfare organizations are invited to bring their animals into the centers. While most stores are equipped with an Everyday Adoption Center that can house cats 24 hours a day, some stores have Enhanced Adoption Centers which lend the ability to house dogs as well, and also include a playroom to meet the animals.  The animal welfare organizations are still responsible for the care of the pets, even when placed in an adoption center.

PetSmart Charities also has a program where they will partner with other local animal welfare agencies in order to further the pet adoption process.

PetSmart stores host adoption events by partnering with local animal rescue and welfare organizations.  In addition, PetSmart Charities sponsors four national adoption events each year showcasing animals from multiple adoption groups in each store.  On average, more than 17,000 pets find a new home during each national adoption event.

The Rescue Waggin’ helps to relocate pets from facilities in overpopulated communities to adoption centers in areas where there is more demand and higher chance of adoption. The Emergency Relief Waggin' program was formed to quickly deliver emergency supplies to areas that have gone through a type of major disaster or emergency.  The trucks are strategically placed at PetSmart owned distribution centers around the country to ensure quick response and deployment.

References

Charities based in Arizona
Pet stores
Animal charities based in the United States